Uthai Thani, one of Thailand's seventy-six provinces (changwat) lies in lower northern Thailand. Neighbouring provinces are (from north clockwise) Nakhon Sawan, Chai Nat, Suphan Buri, Kanchanaburi and Tak. It lies somewhat off the route between Bangkok, 200 km distant and Chiang Mai.

Geography
The province stretches from the upper plains of the Chao Phraya River valley, to forested mountains in the west. The Sakae Krang River, a tributary of the Chao Phraya River, is the main watercourse of in the province.
The Huai Kha Khaeng wildlife sanctuary, at the western boundary bordering Tak province, was declared a World Heritage Site in 1991. It is home to most of the forest animals of Southeast Asia, including tigers and elephants. 
Huai Kha Kaeng wildlife sanctuary, along with one other wildlife sanctuary, make up region 12 (Nakhon Sawan) of Thailand's protected areas.
 Huai Kha Khaeng Wildlife Sanctuary,

History
Originally Mon and Lawa settled in the area. The first Thai settlement in the area was Muang U Thai during the Sukhothai Kingdom, but it was later abandoned when the river changed course. The Patabeut people, of Karen ethnicity, revived the settlement at its current site during the Ayutthaya Kingdom. It served as a fort protecting the boundary of the kingdom.

Uthai Thani is the hometown of the father of King Rama I. He later renamed the city from its old name Uthai to Uthai Thani.

In 1892, King Chulalongkorn (Rama V) added the area of Uthai Thani to the Monthon Nakhon Sawan and in 1898 formed the province.

Symbols
The provincial seal depicts the pavilion at Wat Khao Sakae Krang. It houses the statue of Thongdee, the father of King Rama I and a Buddha footprint. The mountain in the background symbolizes the location of the pavilion on top of Khao Sakae Krang.

The provincial flower is the yellow cotton tree (Cochlospermum regium). The provincial tree is the neem (Azadirachta indica v. siamensis).

The flag of Uthai Thani depicts the provincial seal of Uthai Thani in the middle. The yellow colour at the top of the flag is the colour of the Chakri dynasty, symbolizing gold. The green colour at the bottom is the colour of King Rama I as he was born on a Wednesday, which is associated with green in the Thai calendar. The text below the seal says Uthai Thani province.

Administrative divisions

Provincial government
The province is divided into eight districts (amphoes). These are further divided into 70 subdistricts (tambons) and 642 villages (mubans).

Local government
As of 26 November 2019 there are: one Uthai Thani Provincial Administration Organisation and 14 municipal (thesaban) areas in the province. Uthai Thani has town (thesaban mueang) status. There are a further 13 subdistrict municipalities (thesaban tambon). The non-municipal areas are administered by 49 Subdistrict Administrative Organisations (SAO) (ongkan borihan suan tambon).

Human achievement index 2017

In 2003, United Nations Development Programme (UNDP) in Thailand began tracking progress on human development at the sub-national level using the Human Achievement Index (HAI), a composite index covering eight key areas of human development. The National Economic and Social Development Board (NESDB) took over this task in 2017.

References

External links

Website of the province (Thai only)

 
Provinces of Thailand